Rupert Spira  (1960) is an English spiritual teacher, philosopher and author of the Direct Path based in Oxford, UK.

Life
Just prior to beginning his formal spiritual exploration, Spira attended an exhibition by the studio potter Michael Cardew at Camberwell Arts Centre in London. Spira’s encounter with the arts and spiritual traditions inspired him to abandon the scientific path he was on and begin his art studies with Henry Hammond at West Surrey College of Art and Design in 1977 and take an apprenticeship with Michael Cardew, then aged eighty, at Wenford Bridge Pottery from 1980 to 1982.  Spira graduated from West Surrey College of Art and Design with a BA in 1983.

In 1984, Spira opened his own studio at Lower Froyle in Hampshire, then moved his studio to Shropshire in 1996. Spira’s pieces can be found in private and public collections around the world.

Career as a potter

Spira's early wheel-based pottery work reflected these early influences being in a very traditional Bernard Leach utilitarian style. This work is mostly practical in nature, taking the form of teapots, vases, vessels, plates and other culinary ware.

In 1996, he set up his own pottery at Church Farm in Shropshire where his style changed from a functional to a more minimalist, finer, more complex style ranging in size from miniature to large-scale. While he continues to make and sell functional pottery he is now known for this more recent studio pottery. His best and most recognizable work contains poems, both self-written and by Kathleen Raine the celebrated British poet. The poems are either scratched into the glaze in the sgraffito style or written as embossed letters either in a square block or in a single line across the surface of the vessel. These works vary in size from small prayer bowls only a few centimetres across through to huge, open bowls 50 cm or more in diameter. He is also known for his cylinders which are often made as part of a series and while each stands alone, are meant to be exhibited as a group. These also vary in scale from a few centimetres high through to the largest being a meter or more tall. He works in a limited palette, mainly simple white, off-white and black monochromes but he does also occasionally make deep, red-glazed bowls and bright yellow tea sets.

Career as a spiritual teacher
Spira's considers that his spiritual journey started on reading the poetry of Rumi at age fifteen. Following in his parents' footsteps, he studied at Colet House, London under Dr Francis Roles, himself a student of mystic-philosophers Ouspensky and Gurdjieff and the mantra meditation of Swami Shantananda Saraswati. This also led him to an interest in classical Advaita (non-duality) while he also continued to investigate Sufism through the art of Mevlevi Turning, a form of sacred movement combining prayer and meditation. He also read teachings of Sri Nisargadatta Maharaj and Ramana Maharshi and, in the late 1970s he attended Krishnamurti’s last meetings at Brockwood Park.

In the mid-1990s meetings with Robert Adams and Francis Lucille led Spira to the Direct Path teachings of Atmananda Krishna Menon which forms the basis of his own 'no-nonsense' Direct Path approach to spiritual awakening.

In essence Spira teaches that ‘The greatest discovery in life is that our essential nature does not share the limits or the destiny of the body and mind'. He suggests that a form of happiness, a satisfying if unexotic 'enlightenment', can be found if one can identify with the I that lies behind the imagined I of feelings and thoughts.

Selected public collections
Victoria and Albert museum
Sainsbury Centre for Visual Arts

Books
 The Transparency of Things, Non-Duality Press, 2008
 Presence: The Art of Peace and Happiness, Non-Duality Press, 2011
 Presence: The Intimacy of all Experience, Non-Duality Press, 2011
 The Ashes of Love, Sahaja Publications, 2016
 The Nature of Consciousness, Sahaja Publications, 2017
 Being Aware of Being Aware, Sahaja Publications, 2017
 A Meditation on I Am, New Harbinger, 2021
 The Essential Self, Sahaja Publications, 2021
 Being Myself, Sahaja Publications, 2021
 You Are the Happiness You Seek, Sahaja Publications, 2022

References

External links

 

1960 births
Living people
English potters
Neo-Advaita teachers